The 2006 Gerry Weber Open was a men's tennis tournament played on outdoor grass courts. It was the 14th edition of the Gerry Weber Open, and was part of the International Series of the 2006 ATP Tour. It took place at the Gerry Weber Stadion in Halle, North Rhine-Westphalia, Germany, from June 12 through June 18, 2006.

The singles field was led by World No. 1, Australian Open champion, French Open runner-up, and 2003, 2004 and 2005 Halle winner Roger Federer, Australian Open semifinalist Nicolas Kiefer, and Auckland titlist Jarkko Nieminen. Also present were Australian Open runner-up Marcos Baghdatis, Adelaide semifinalist Tomáš Berdych, Tommy Haas, Christophe Rochus and Kristof Vliegen.

Finals

Singles

 Roger Federer defeated  Tomáš Berdych, 6–0, 6–7(4–7), 6–2
It was Federer's 5th title of the year and the 38th of his career. It was his 4th consecutive win at the event.

Doubles

 Fabrice Santoro /  Nenad Zimonjić defeated  Michael Kohlmann /  Rainer Schüttler, 6–0, 6–4
It was Santoro's 2nd title of the year and the 24th of his career. It was Zimonjic's 2nd title of the year and the 12th of his career.

External links
 Official website 
 Singles draw
 Doubles draw
 Qualifying Singles draw

 
Gerry Weber Open
Halle Open
2006 in German tennis